Yuanmiao Temple, may refer to:

 Yuanmiao Temple (Putian), in Putian, Fujian, China
 Yuanmiao Temple (Huizhou), in Huizhou, Fujian, China